The Audie Murphy American Cotton Museum is located at 600 Interstate 30 East, in the city of Greenville,   county of Hunt, in the U.S. state of Texas. It was established in 1987. Cotton was Hunt County's largest cash crop in the early 20th century, and the museum features a "History of Cotton" exhibit.

Much of the focus of the museum is dedicated to military veterans.  Medal of Honor recipient Audie Murphy was born in Hunt County and worked in Greenville before entering the military. The Hunt County War Memorial was dedicated on the museum's grounds in 2004.  The memorial features a  bronze statue of Murphy created by Greenville artist Gordon Thomas. The granite stones that circle the monument are carved with the names of the county's war dead. Other stones contain quotes from Murphy, Franklin D. Roosevelt, and Ronald Reagan.

In 2012, the Audie L. Murphy Memorial VA Hospital in San Antonio transferred its collection of Murphy-related memorabilia to the museum for its permanent collection. The museum sponsors the area's annual Audie Murphy Days, usually scheduled in June.

Gallery

Exhibits and displays

On the grounds

References

External links

 
 Audie L. Murphy Memorial Website 

Museums in Hunt County, Texas
Biographical museums in Texas
Agriculture museums in the United States
Museums established in 1987
1987 establishments in Texas
Audie Murphy